Walkerith is a hamlet within the civil parish of East Stockwith, in the West Lindsey district of Lincolnshire, England.

The name 'Walkerith' derives from the Old English for 'landing place of a fuller'.

Trades listed included a boat builder, the licensed victualler of the Ferry Hotel, and four farmers.

Prior to 1866 Walkerwith was, for administrative purposes, a township, afterwards a civil parish.

References

External links

"Walkerith CP/Tn: Census Tables" Walkerwith Census data; Visionofbritain.org.uk 1881–1961; Retrieved 20 April 2012 
"East Stockwith", Genuki.org.uk. Retrieved 20 April 2012

Hamlets in Lincolnshire
West Lindsey District
Former civil parishes in Lincolnshire